Qareh Zeki or Qarah Zaki may refer to:
 Qarah Zaki, East Azerbaijan
 Qareh Zeki, Zanjan